Yamasato Dam is a dam in the Fukushima Prefecture of Japan, completed in 1943.

References 

Dams in Fukushima Prefecture
Dams completed in 1943